Chromadorina is a genus of nematodes belonging to the family Chromadoridae.

The genus was first described by Filipjev.

The species of this genus are found in Europe and America.

Species:
 Chromadorina bioculata
 Chromadorina viridis

References

Nematodes